"There Is a Mountain" is a song and single written and performed by British singer-songwriter Donovan, released in 1967.

Background
The lyrics refer to a Buddhist saying originally formulated by Qingyuan Weixin, later translated by D. T. Suzuki in his Essays in Zen Buddhism, one of the first books to popularize Buddhism in Europe and the US. Qingyuan writes<blockquote>
Before I had studied Chan (Zen) for thirty years, I saw mountains as mountains, and rivers as rivers. When I arrived at a more intimate knowledge, I came to the point where I saw that mountains are not mountains, and rivers are not rivers. But now that I have got its very substance I am at rest. For it's just that I see mountains once again as mountains, and rivers once again as rivers.</blockquote>

Featured musicians are Donovan (vocals and acoustic guitar), Tony Carr on percussion, Harold McNair on flute and arrangement and Danny Thompson on bass.
The B-side of the single is "Sand and Foam", an acoustic album cut about a nighttime visit to a Mexican beach  Donovan took while on vacation. It was drawn from Mellow Yellow, which was released a few months prior to "There is a Mountain".

Chart performance
It charted in the UK  at No. 8
It charted in the USA at No. 11 on Billboard's Hot 100 and at No. 9 on the Cashbox chart.

Cover versions
Kenny Loggins covered the tune in 2009 with his youngest daughter Hana on his album All Join In.
Dandy Livingstone covered the song in 1967.
The Bobs covered the song in 1994 for their album The Bobs Cover the Songs of….
Steve Earle Covered the song on many of the dates on his 2015 Terraplane World Tour, most notably at HSBF in San Francisco and in Donovan's home city of Glasgow on Oct 27th 2015.
Wailing Souls covered the song on their album Psychedelic Souls.
"Mountain Jam" on The Allman Brothers Band 1972 album Eat A Peach includes the "There Is A Mountain" theme and gives credit to Donovan.
The Grateful Dead song "Alligator," from the album Anthem of the Sun'' includes a "There Is A Mountain" reference at about 9:00.

References

External links
 There Is a Mountain (Single) - Donovan Unofficial Site

Donovan songs
Songs written by Donovan
1967 singles
Song recordings produced by Mickie Most
Kenny Loggins songs
1967 songs
Epic Records singles
Pye Records singles